Vladimír Hubáček (28 August 1932 – 2 September 2021) was a Czech rally driver.

Biography
From the 1950s to the 1970s, Hubáček competed in rally cars such as the Škoda Octavia, the Renault 8 Gordini, and the Alpine A110. He won a total of 25 races, including the Barum Czech Rally Zlín three times. In 1969, he won the Cup of Peace and Friendship.

Vladimír Hubáček died on 2 September 2021 at the age of 89.

References

1932 births
2021 deaths
Czech rally drivers
Formula Three drivers
People from Nechanice
Sportspeople from the Hradec Králové Region